Alexander Benjamin Spiro (born December 12, 1982) is an American trial lawyer. He is a partner at the New York office of Quinn Emanuel Urquhart & Sullivan.

Early life and education 
Spiro was born in New York and grew up in Boston.

Spiro studied Biopsychology at Tufts University. While in college, he considered a career in psychiatry and worked on an adolescent psychiatry unit at McLean Hospital. In 2008, Spiro received his J.D. from Harvard Law School.

Legal career 

In 2016, Spiro filed a lawsuit against the University of Oregon on behalf of two basketball players who were expelled after being accused of sexually assaulting a freshman at an off-campus party in 2014. The lawsuit alleged that Oregon investigators were biased against the expelled students and asked for damages in the amount of $10 million for each player. The lawsuit has been dismissed by the 9th U.S. Circuit Court of Appeals unanimously.

Also in 2016, Spiro represented Aaron Hernandez in his double homicide trial and the appeal of his 2015 murder conviction in which he was initially acquitted, although Hernandez’s murder conviction was reinstated in a ruling from Massachusetts’ highest court in 2019.

In 2017, Spiro won a lawsuit against New York City, which agreed to pay $4 million to Thabo Sefolosha, who was an NBA player for the Atlanta Hawks at the time. In the federal lawsuit, he accused five police officers of false arrest and using excessive force during an encounter outside a Manhattan nightclub.

In 2018, Spiro was part of the defense team for David Demos, defending his case involving the use of illegal sales practices, including fraud for lying to clients. Another notable case of this instance includes that of Jesse Litvak.

In February 2019, Spiro was asked by Jay-Z and Roc Nation to help with the immigration arrest of rapper/songwriter 21 Savage, resulting in the rapper's release from federal custody.

In March 2019, Spiro was chosen to be part of Robert Kraft's legal team, defending him against misdemeanor charges of solicitation.

In September 2019, Spiro obtained a dismissal of a breach of contract and unjust enrichment claim brought by a former trainer of tennis player Naomi Osaka.

In December 2019, Spiro defended Elon Musk in a defamation case raised by Vernon Unsworth from statements made relating to their involvement in the Tham Luang cave rescue. The jury ultimately found Musk not liable. Spiro has also represented Musk in a suit brought by shareholders over Tesla acquiring SolarCity. In 2022, after Musk took control of Twitter, Spiro has taken an active role in the legal team, and led conversations about a 25% layoff of employees.

In March 2020, Spiro and hip-hop artists Killer Mike, Meek Mill, Yo Gotti, and Chance the Rapper sent a brief to the United States Supreme Court, detailing the ways rap music is stigmatized and stereotyped by the legal system.

In May 2020, Spiro filed a lawsuit against the health care providers for inmates at Mississippi prisons, after Jay-Z's Roc Nation filed their own lawsuit on behalf of a group of inmates. The lawsuit accuses them of an "entire breakdown in Mississippi prisons' healthcare system."

In May 2021, the family of Don Lewis hired Spiro to investigate his 1997 disappearance which gained renewed interest after the airing of the Netflix series Tiger King.

In June 2021, Spiro obtained a temporary restraining order against Roc Nation co-founder Damon Dash in Manhattan federal court, blocking a planned non-fungible token auction of his copyright interest in Jay-Z’s debut album Reasonable Doubt.

In November 2021, a New York Jury decided in favor of Spiro, finding Jay-Z not liable in a suit stemming from a cologne deal in 2013. Jay-Z was awarded $4.5 million as a result.

Spiro has previously been involved with investigations and litigation surrounding Robert Durst and Philip Seymour Hoffman. Spiro has represented musical artists, such as Mick Jagger and Bobby Shmurda, as well as athletes, including Charles Oakley and Julian Edelman.

In a filing against SEC to rescind a consent decree, Spiro paraphrased Eminem's song "Without Me": (SEC) won’t let me be or let me be me so let me see; They tried to shut me down, replacing FCC with SEC. That SEC decree requires Musk's tweets about his businesses, especially Tesla, to be vetted by Tesla's lawyers before posting.

Prosecution 

Spiro worked at the Manhattan District Attorney's Office as an Assistant District Attorney until 2013. He prosecuted Rodney Alcala, known as “The Dating Game Killer," for two New York murders in the 1970s.

References 

1982 births
Living people
American lawyers
Tufts University alumni
Harvard Law School alumni
Criminal defense lawyers
McLean Hospital people
Quinn Emanuel Urquhart & Sullivan people